Manton is a village and civil parish in North Lincolnshire, England. The population of the civil parish at the 2011 census was 123. The parish includes the hamlet of Cleatham. Cleatham was a civil parish between 1866 and 1936.

Geography
The parish church is a Grade II listed building dedicated to Saint Hybald. It was built of limestone in 1861 by J. M. Hooker, and Wheeler of Tunbridge Wells. 
The church was made redundant by the Diocese of Lincoln in 1998, and it was sold for residential use in 2003. Its parson from 1568 was John Robotham, who was accused of missing evening prayers and even Easter communion in order to play bowls. He had a number of legal battles with parishioners, some of whom he served a summons on during church services.

Cleatham Hall is a Grade II listed house dating from 1855 but with earlier origins.

History
The last known player of the Lincolnshire bagpipes, John Hunsley, lived in Manton in the mid-1800s.

Darwin family
William Darwin (1655-1682, Charles Darwin's great-great grandfather) was from Cleatham and married Anne Waring (1664-1722) of Elston in 1680, and moved to Elston. His son would be Robert Darwin (1682-1754), Charles Darwin's great-grandfather.

References

Further reading
Manton in Kelly's Directory of Lincolnshire with the Port of Hull and Neighbourhood. With Map of the County. by E. R. Kelly, 1885
 Article on the excavation of the Anglo-Saxon cemetery at Cleatham, the third largest in England.

External links

Civil parishes in Lincolnshire
Villages in the Borough of North Lincolnshire